The Yan Xiaoling – Fan Yanqiong case, also known as the Fujian Netizen Case, occurred from June 2009 through April 2010 in Fuzhou, Fujian Province, People's Republic of China. Yan Xiaoling, a 25-year-old woman from Minqing County, was found dead in February 2008 and was believed by her mother Lin Xiuying to be murdered after being gang raped by a group of ruffians who had connection with the local police, while the officials insisted that she had died from an ectopic pregnancy. Three human rights activists in Fuzhou, Fan Yanqiong, You Jingyou and Wu Huaying, offered assistance by interviewing Yan's mother and putting the filmed footage online on June 24, 2009, but were soon, among several other netizens, arrested by Fuzhou police and thrown into custody. The three were charged with, but never legally convicted of, making false and malicious accusation and had been detained for nine months before the final verdict was announced on April 16, 2010 without any public trial. The case ended with Fan Yanqiong being sentenced to two years in jail and You Jingyou and Wu Huaying to one year. Fujian authorities later asked for the release of the suspects and an appeal was filed, but it was dismissed in court and the original verdict was upheld.

References 

2009 in China
2010 in China
Crime in China
Human rights in China
Sex scandals
Internet-based activism
Fuzhou
Rape in China
Trials in China
Weiquan movement
History of Fujian